Android Automotive (aka Android Automotive OS or AAOS) is a variation of Google's Android operating system, tailored for its use in vehicle dashboards. Introduced in March 2017, the platform was developed by Google and Intel, together with car manufacturers such as Volvo and Audi. The project aims to provide an operating system codebase for vehicle manufacturers to develop their own version of the operating system. Besides infotainment tasks, such as messaging, navigation and music playback, the operating system aims to handle vehicle-specific functions such as controlling the air conditioning.

In contrast to Android Auto, Android Automotive is a full operating system running on the vehicle's device, not relying on a smartphone to operate.

Android Automotive is an open source operating system and, as such, a car manufacturer can use it without the Google Automotive Services (GAS), which are a collection of applications and services (Google Maps, Google Play, Google Assistant, etc.) that OEMs can license and integrate into their in-vehicle infotainment systems. Volvo, Ford and GM are using AAOS with GAS (advertised as "Cars with Google built-in" by Google).

History
The operating system was first announced by Google in March 2017.

In February 2018, Polestar (Volvo's brand for electric performance cars) announced the Polestar 2, the first car with built-in Android Automotive. The Polestar 2 with Android Automotive is available since July 2020.

In September 2018, the Renault–Nissan–Mitsubishi Alliance announced a technology partnership to embed the Android Automotive operating system in the group's vehicles starting in 2021.

In April 2019 Google opened up the APIs for developers to start developing applications for Android Automotive.

In September 2019 General Motors announced that they will use Android Automotive to power the infotainment systems in its cars starting in 2021.

In July 2020, Stellantis (formerly Groupe PSA and FCA Group) announced they would power their infotainment systems with Android Automotive OS. This announcement was revoked in 2022.Some vehicles from the group, like the 2021 Dodge Durango and Chrysler Pacifica, are already using the Android Automotive-based Uconnect 5, without the Google Automotive Services (GAS).

In February 2021, Ford announced a partnership with Google that would bring Android Automotive to Ford and Lincoln vehicles, starting in 2023.

In May 2021, Lucid Motors revealed that the Lucid Air was using Android Automotive for its infotainment system, but without the Google Automotive Services (GAS).

In September 2021, Honda announced that it would use Google's Android Automotive OS in its cars starting in 2022.

In June 2022, BMW announced that it will be expanding its BMW Operating System 8 and integrating Android Automotive into certain models, starting in March 2023. In January 2023, during the Consumer Electronics Show, BMW revealed that BMW Operating System 9 will be based on Android Automotive but without the Google Automotive Services (GAS). BMW OS 9 will feature the Aptiode app store, but lower OS versions will not.

In March 2023, the Volkswagen Group announced that its future infotainment system, called One.Infotainment, will be based on Android Automotive (AOSP), and include an app store developed in partnership with Harman International.

Vehicles with Android Automotive (with GAS)

 Polestar 2
 Polestar 3
 Polestar 4
 Polestar 5
 GMC Hummer EV
 2022+ GMC Sierra
 2022+ GMC Yukon
 2022+ Chevrolet Tahoe
 2022+ Chevrolet Suburban
 2022+ Chevrolet Silverado
 Chevrolet Silverado EV
 Chevrolet Equinox EV
 Chevrolet Corvette E-Ray
  Cadillac Lyriq
 2024+ Cadillac XT4
 Renault Austral
 Renault Mégane E-Tech Electric
 Volvo XC40 Recharge
 Volvo C40
 Volvo EX90
 2022+ Volvo S90, V90, V90 Cross Country
 2022+ Volvo XC60
 2023+ Volvo XC90
 2023+ Volvo S60, V60, V60 Cross Country
 2023+ Volvo XC40
 2023+ Honda Accord

Vehicles with Android Automotive (without GAS)

 Rivian R1T
 Rivian R1S
 Lucid Air
 Lynk & Co 01
 2022+ Maserati Ghibli, Levante, Quattroporte
 2021+ Dodge Durango
 2021+ Chrysler Pacifica
 Sono Motors Sion
 2023+ BMW X1

See also
 QNX

References

External links
 Android Automotive page at the AOSP

Android (operating system)
Google software
Automotive technology tradenames
Technology articles needing attention